What a Plant Knows is a popular science book by Daniel Chamovitz, originally published in 2012, discussing the sensory system of plants. A revised edition was published in 2017.

Release details / Editions / Publication
Hardcover edition, 2012
Paperback version, 2013
Revised edition, 2017

What a Plant Knows has been translated and published in a number of languages.

References

 Book Review: What a Plant Knows. The Wall Street Journal.
 "What a Plant Knows by Daniel Chamovitz – review". The Guardian.

Botany books
Plant cognition